In the human brainstem, the solitary nucleus, also called nucleus of the solitary tract, nucleus solitarius, and nucleus tractus solitarii, (SN or NTS) is a series of purely sensory
nuclei (clusters of nerve cell bodies) forming a vertical column of grey matter embedded in the medulla oblongata. Through the center of the SN runs the solitary tract, a white bundle of nerve fibers, including fibers from the facial, glossopharyngeal and vagus nerves, that innervate the SN. The SN projects to, among other regions, the reticular formation, parasympathetic preganglionic neurons, hypothalamus and thalamus, forming circuits that contribute to autonomic regulation. Cells along the length of the SN are arranged roughly in accordance with function; for instance, cells involved in taste are located in the rostral part, while those receiving information from cardio-respiratory and gastrointestinal processes are found in the caudal part.

Inputs
 Taste information from the facial nerve via the chorda tympani (anterior 2/3 of the tongue), glossopharyngeal nerve (posterior 1/3) and vagus nerve (small area on the epiglottis)
 Chemoreceptors and mechanoreceptors of the general visceral afferent pathway (GVA) in the carotid body via glossopharyngeal nerve, aortic bodies, and the sinoatrial node, via the vagus nerve  
 Chemically and mechanically sensitive neurons of the general visceral afferent pathway (GVA) with endings located in the heart, lungs, airways, gastrointestinal system, pharynx, and liver via the glossopharyngeal and vagus nerves.  Organ specific regions of neuronal architecture are preserved in the solitary nucleus. Additional minor GVA input from the nasal cavity, soft palate and sinus cavities enters via the facial nerve.
Neurons that innervate the SN mediate the gag reflex, the carotid sinus reflex, the aortic reflex, the cough reflex, the baroreceptor and chemoreceptor reflexes, several respiratory reflexes and reflexes within the gastrointestinal system regulating motility and secretion.

Neurons which transmit signals about the gut wall, the stretch of the lungs, and the dryness of mucous membranes also innervate the SN. The first central neurons within the SN can participate in simple autonomic reflexes.

Outputs

Information goes from the solitary nucleus to a large number of other regions of the brain including the paraventricular nucleus of the hypothalamus and the central nucleus of the amygdala, as well as to other nuclei in the brainstem (such as the parabrachial area, the locus coeruleus,  the dorsal raphe nucleus, and other visceral motor or respiratory networks). The signals projected from the SN to the parabrachial area originate in the oral cavity and gastrointestinal tract. The pathways for gastric and gustatory (taste) processes are believed to terminate in different subdivisions of the parabrachial area, but still interact in the SN. Some neuronal subpopulations in the SN, such as the noradrenergic cell group A2 and the aldosterone-sensitive HSD2 neurons project as far ventral as the bed nucleus of the stria terminalis.

Additional images

See also
Solitary tract

References

External links
 

Cranial nerve nuclei
Medulla oblongata
Vagus nerve
Glossopharyngeal nerve
Facial nerve